The Shapur II's Arab campaign took place in 325, against numerous Arab tribes, due to the Arab incursions into the Sasanian Empire. Shapur II decisively defeated all the Arab tribes during his campaign, and became known as Dhū al-Aktāf to the Arabs, meaning “he who pierces shoulders”.

Arab incursions
During the childhood of Shapur II, Arab nomads made several incursions into the Sasanian homeland of Pars, where they raided Gor and its surroundings. Furthermore, they also made incursions into Meshan and Mazun.

Shapur II's campaign
At the age of 16, Shapur II led an expedition against the Arabs. According to al-Tabari, he hand-picked 1,000 cavalrymen for the campaign, a possible reference to the pushtigban unit. He primarily campaigned against the Iyad tribe in Asoristan and thereafter he crossed the Persian Gulf, reaching al-Khatt, a region between present-day Bahrain and Qatar. He then attacked the Banu Tamim in Hajar mountains. Shapur II reportedly killed a large number of the Arab population and destroyed their water supplies by stopping their wells with sand.

After having dealt with the Arabs of eastern Arabia, he continued his expedition into western Arabia and Syrian Desert, where he attacked several cities—he even went as far as Medina. Because of his cruel way of dealing with the Arabs, he was called Dhū al-aktāf ("he who pierces shoulders") by them. Not only did Shapur II pacify the Arabs of the Persian Gulf, but he also pushed many Arab tribes further into the Arabian Peninsula. Furthermore, he also deported some Arab tribes by force; the Taghlib to Bahrain and al-Khatt; the Banu Abdul Qays and Banu Tamim to Hajar; the Banu Bakr to Kirman, and the Banu Hanzalah to a place near Hormizd-Ardashir.

The Zoroastrian scripture Bundahishn also mentions the Arabian campaign of Shapur II, where it says the following: "During the rulership of Shapur (II), the son of Hormizd, the Arabs came; they took Khorig Rūdbār; for many years with contempt (they) rushed until Shapur came to rulership; he destroyed the Arabs and took the land and destroyed many Arab rulers and pulled out many numbers of shoulders".

Colonies of Persian officials and soldiers were settled in new garrisons along the Arabian coastlands of the Persian Gulf, especially in Oman's strategic coast in Al Batinah Region, including the tip of the Musandam Peninsula, Sohar, and Rustaq.

In order to prevent the Arabs to make more raids into his country, Shapur II ordered the construction of a defensive line near al-Hira, which became known as Wall of the Arabs (Middle Persian: war ī tāzīgān, in  khandaq Sābūr, "Ditch of Shapur").

References

Sources

Battles involving the Sasanian Empire
325
History of the Middle East
Banu Taghlib
Banu Bakr
Battles of pre-Islamic Arabia
History of the Persian Gulf
Shapur II
Abd al-Qays
Banu Tamim
Ancient Upper Mesopotamia